Riane Tennenhaus Eisler (born 22 July 1931) is an Austrian-born American systems scientist and author who writes about the effect of gender politics historically on society. She is most known for her 1987 book The Chalice and the Blade, in which she coined the terms "partnership" and "dominator".

Life
Eisler was born in Vienna in 1931 before her family fled from the Nazis in 1939 to Cuba. She and her parents lived in a slum in Havana for seven years, after which they emigrated to the United States, to Miami, New York, and Chicago before finally settling in Los Angeles.
Eisler has degrees in sociology and law from the University of California. She is an attorney, legal scholar and author. She has published thirteen books, including one memoir, The Gate, published in 2000. Her first book, published in 1977, was Dissolution: No-Fault Divorce, Marriage, and the Future of Women. Her second book, published in 1979, was on the Equal Rights Amendment.

In her third book The Chalice and the Blade, published in 1987, she coined the terms "partnership" and "dominator" to describe the two underlying forms of society. Partnership societies are characterized by gender equality, peace, sustainability, caring, while dominator societies are characterized by sexism, chronic war, ecological destruction, and unsustainability. According to her research, which references the work of archaeologists Marija Gimbutas and James Mellaart, among others, for millennia human societies were built on partnership, in which human capacity to give, nurture and sustain life was held in the highest regard, and shared responsibility was the gold standard. The fall into domination occurred around 6,500 years ago.

The Chalice and the Blade has sold over 500,000 copies and been translated into around 25 languages.

Eisler has argued that the switch from partnership to dominator has led to gender biased monogamy, prostitution and illegitimacy, women's dependence and the acceptance of chronic war.

She is editor-in-chief of the Interdisciplinary Journal of Partnership Studies at the University of Minnesota.

The Center for Partnership Studies
In 1987, in partnership with her husband David Elliot Loye, Eisler founded The Center for Partnership Studies, which was later renamed The Center for Partnership Systems. The organization is "dedicated to research, education, and building tools to construct economic and social systems that support human beings and the planet that sustains us."

Influence
Philosopher Terence McKenna referenced Eisler's work throughout his writings and talks, including in The Archaic Revival. Eisler's term dominator culture has been used by writers ranging from bell hooks to Tao Lin.

Ashley Montagu called her book The Chalice and the Blade “The most important book since Darwin’s Origin of Species." Isabel Allende said of the book: "Some books are like revelations, they open the spirit to unimaginable possibilities."

Selected bibliography 
 1977 — Dissolution: No-Fault Divorce, Marriage, and the Future of Women. New York: McGraw-Hill. ISBN 1583480293
 1979 — The Equal Rights Handbook: What ERA Means to Your Life, Your Rights, and the Future. Avon. ISBN 1583480250
 1987 – The Chalice and The Blade: Our History, Our Future. New York: Harper & Row. ISBN 0062502891
 1990 — The Partnership Way: New Tools for Living and Learning, Healing Our Families, and Our World. San Francisco: Harper. ISBN 0062502905
 1995 – Sacred Pleasure: Sex, Myth, and the Politics of the Body.  San Francisco: Harper. ISBN 0062502832
 2000 — Tomorrow's Children: A Blueprint for Partnership Education in the 21st Century. Boulder: Westview Press. ISBC 0813390400
 2000 — The Gate.  iUniverse. ISBN 0595001858
 2002 — The Power of Partnership: Seven Relationships that Will Change Your Life. New World Library. ISBN 1577311787 
 2007 — The Real Wealth of Nations: Creating a Caring Economy. Berrett-Koehler Publishers. ISBN 1576753883
 2019 — Nurturing Our Humanity: How Domination and Partnership Shape Our Brains, Lives, and Future. with Douglas P. Fry. Oxford University Press. ISBN 0190935723

See also 
 Marija Gimbutas
 James Mellaart

References

External links 
 
 

American feminists
American sociologists
American women sociologists
Austrian sociologists
Austrian women sociologists
Feminist studies scholars
Living people
Emigrants from Austria after the Anschluss
Austrian emigrants to Cuba
Cuban emigrants to the United States
American non-fiction writers
Nautilus Book Award winners
American women's rights activists
American human rights activists
Women human rights activists
American relationships and sexuality writers
Matriarchy
1931 births
American women non-fiction writers
21st-century American women